North Nowra is a suburb of Nowra in the City of Shoalhaven in New South Wales, Australia. It lies northwest of Nowra. There are four schools; a pre-school, a junior school, a special needs school and a stage school. Shoalhaven Zoo is found there on the north bank of the Shoalhaven River. Notable former residents include actress Christie Hayes.

References

City of Shoalhaven